The 1996–97 Slovak Extraliga season was the fourth season of the Slovak Extraliga, the top level of ice hockey in Slovakia. 10 teams participated in the league, and Dukla Trencin won the championship.

Regular season

First round

Final round

Relegation

Playoffs

Semifinals 
 HC Košice - ŠKP PS Poprad 3:0 (6:3,5:2,3:2 OT)
 Dukla Trenčín - Martimex ZŤS Martin 3:0 (10:4,6:2,2:1)

5th place 
 Slovan Bratislava - HK 32 Liptovský Mikuláš 2:0 (7:2,7:5)

3rd place 
 Martimex ZŤS Martin-ŠKP PS Poprad 0:2 (0:2,3:4)

Final 
 Dukla Trenčín - HC Košice 3:1 (5:3,1:5,5:2,6:1)

External links
 Slovak Ice Hockey Federation

Slovak Extraliga seasons
Slovakia
Slovak